A list of current public holidays in South Africa:
In gold, the National Day

The Public Holidays Act (Act No 36 of 1994) states that whenever a public holiday falls on a Sunday, the Monday following it will be a public holiday.

Once-off holidays

Since 1994 election days have been declared ad hoc public holidays:
 National and provincial government elections – 2 June 1999
 National and provincial government elections – 14 April 2004
 Local government elections – 1 March 2006
 National and provincial government elections – 22 April 2009
 Local government elections – 18 May 2011
 National and provincial government elections – 7 May 2014
 Local government elections – 3 August 2016
 National and provincial government elections – 8 May 2019
 Local government elections – 01 November 2021

31 December 1999 and 2 January 2000 were declared public holidays to accommodate the Y2K changeover, and 3 January 2000 was automatically a public holiday because the previous holiday was a Sunday.

2 May 2008 was declared a public holiday when Human Rights Day and Good Friday coincided on 21 March 2008.

27 December 2011 was declared a holiday by deputy president Kgalema Motlanthe as Christmas Day fell on a Sunday which generally makes the following Monday a public holiday. However, the following Monday, 26 December 2011, was the Day of Goodwill and therefore decreased the number of paid public holidays for the year. Initially this day was not to be declared a public holiday but in mid-December the decision was changed.

27 December 2016 was declared a holiday by president Jacob Zuma following a request by the Federation of Unions of South Africa (FEDUSA). The request by FEDUSA was motivated by the fact this year, workers in the country will only have 11 public holidays instead of 12 due to fact that 25 December (Christmas Day) falls on a Sunday. The declaration of 27 December as a public holiday, the Presidency said, will ensure that workers are not unduly disadvantaged because of this unusual event and are still entitled to their 12 paid public holidays.

27 December 2022 was declared a holiday by president Cyril Ramaphosa
In view of the unique circumstances around the 2022 calendar, and to uphold relevant labour law principles and practices, President Ramaphosa has declared Tuesday, 27 December, as a public holiday in lieu of Christmas Day.
COSATU urged Cyril Ramaphosa to declare December 27 a public holiday, saying it would also show appreciation for the sacrifices workers had made in keeping the economy moving.

Religious public holidays
The Christian holidays of Christmas Day and Good Friday remained in secular post-apartheid South Africa's calendar of public holidays. The Commission for the Promotion and Protection of the Rights of Cultural, Religious and Linguistic Communities (CRL Rights Commission), a chapter nine institution established in 2004, held countrywide consultative public hearings in June and July 2012 to assess the need for a review of public holidays following the receipt of complaints from minority groups about unfair discrimination. The CRL Rights Commission stated that they would submit their recommendations to the Department of Home Affairs, the Department of Labour, various Portfolio Committees and the Office of the Presidency by October 2012. On 10 November 2012 the Minister of Home Affairs Naledi Pandor told Christian protesters objecting to the removal of Christian public holidays that she had not received any enquiries from the CRL Rights Commission yet. The CRL Rights Commission published its recommendations on 17 April 2013, including the scrapping of some existing public holidays to free up days for some non-Christian religious public holidays. On 18 January 2015 the South African Law Reform Commission published a discussion document on legislation administered by the Department of Home Affairs in which it suggested "that either these holidays be reviewed or that equal weight be given to holidays of other faiths".

Historical public holidays
South Africa's present calendar of public holidays was introduced in 1994.  During the period between Union in 1910, and the establishment of the present republic in 1994, the following were the official public holidays:
In gold, the former National Day

References

External links
 South African National Holidays in iCalendar format

 
Holidays
South African culture
Society of South Africa
Observances in South Africa
South Africa

pt:Cultura da África do Sul#Feriados nacionais